

Events
May 10 – A deputy is appointed to take charge of Geoffrey Chaucer’s duties at customs, Chaucer being busy with diplomatic business.  Chaucer makes two trips to France in the course of this year.
Ibn Khaldun begins work on the Muqaddimah.
Nicole Oresme is elected bishop of Lisieux. Oresme's French translations from Latin versions of Aristotle are an important contribution to the development of the French language.
Ali ibn Mohammed al-Jurjani returns to Shiraz from Constantinople to become a teacher.
Production of the earliest known copy of the Laurentian Codex.
Scottish poet John Barbour is rewarded for his latest work with ten pounds Scots.

Births
May 2 - Oswald von Wolkenstein, Austrian poet (died 1445)

Deaths
April - Guillaume de Machaut, French poet and composer (born c.1300)

References

 
Literature
Literature by year